Goin' Home is the second album by tubist Bob Stewart which was recorded in 1988 and released on the JMT label.

Reception
The AllMusic review by Scott Yanow called it "Stimulating and often-surprising music that is generally more accessible than one might expect".

Track listing
All compositions by Bob Stewart except as indicated
 "Subi la Nas Alturas" (Kelvyn Bell) - 7:04   
 "Art Deco" (Don Cherry) - 6:14   
 "Bell and Ponce" (Olu Dara) - 6:00   
 "Tunk" - 6:55   
 "Sugar Finger" (Traditional) - 5:33   
 "Sweet Georgia Brown Sweet:" - 5:17   
 "Sweet Georgia Brown" (Ben Bernie, Maceo Pinkard, Kenneth Casey) - 3:59
 "Windmill" (Kenny Dorham) - 0:39
 "Donna" (Jackie McLean) - 0:35
 "Priestess" (Billy Harper) - 12:37

Personnel
Bob Stewart - tuba
Earl Gardner (tracks 1 & 7), James Zoller - trumpet
John Clark - French horn (track 7)
Steve Turre - trombone
Jerome Harris - electric guitar
Buddy Williams (tracks 1, 3 & 3-7), Ed Blackwell (tracks 2 & 4) - drums
Frank Conlon - percussion (tracks 1 & 5)

References 

1989 albums
Bob Stewart (musician) albums
JMT Records albums
Winter & Winter Records albums